Salutation may also refer to:

Salutation (ballet), 1936
Salutations (play), 1966
Vito & the Salutations, 1960s doo-wop group
Salutations (album), Conor Oberst 2017 
Salutation, by composer Charles Edmund Rubbra
The Salutation, Sandwich
The Salutation, Hammersmith
Salutation Island (sv), Henri Freycinet Harbour